The 1939–40 National Hurling League was the 13th edition of the National Hurling League, which ran from 2 October 1939 until 7 April 1940.

The nine participating teams were Clare, Cork, Dublin, Galway, Kilkenny, Laois, Limerick, Tipperary and Waterford who were divided into two divisions. Two points awarded for a win and one point awarded for a drawn game..

Cork won the league, beating Tipperary by 8-9 to 6-4 in the final.

National Hurling League

Group A

Group B

Knock-out stage

Final

External links
 1939-40 National Hurling League results

References

National Hurling League seasons
League
League